The 2022 New York State Comptroller election took place on November 8, 2022, to elect the New York State Comptroller. The incumbent Democratic Comptroller Thomas DiNapoli won re-election to a fifth term. Paul Rodríguez, a financial advisor from Queens, was the Republican nominee.

Democratic primary

Candidates

Official designee
 Thomas DiNapoli, incumbent Comptroller (2007–present)

Write-in candidates who did not qualify for ballot access 
 
 Quanda Francis, President of Sykes Capital Management

Republican primary

Candidates

Official designee
 Paul Rodríguez, financial advisor and Conservative Party nominee for New York City Comptroller in 2021

Endorsements

General election

Polling 
Graphical summary

Endorsements

Results

Notes

References

https://ballotpedia.org/New_York_Comptroller_election,_2022

External links
Official campaign websites
Thomas DiNapoli (D) for Comptroller
Paul Rodríguez (R) for Comptroller

New York State Comptroller elections
2022 New York (state) elections